Occasionally called "The Olympics of 4x4", Camel Trophy was an off-road vehicle oriented competition that was held annually between 1980 and 2000, and it was best known for its use of Land Rover vehicles over challenging terrain. The event took its name from its main sponsor, the Camel cigarette brand.

Vehicles 

Camel Trophy originated in 1980 with three Jeep-equipped German teams exploring the Amazon Basin. After that first event, the organisers turned to Land Rover for support and over the course of the next twenty years, all of the Land Rover vehicle range were used. Range Rover, Land Rover Series III, Land Rover 90, Land Rover 110, Land Rover Defender, Land Rover Discovery, and Freelander vehicles all appeared in the distinctive "sandglow" colour scheme.

The cars were heavily modified by Land Rover Special Vehicles with a range of expedition, recovery, and safety equipment, including:

 Safety Devices roll cages
 Under body protection and steering guards
 Modified electrical systems
 Winches
 Dixon Bate tow hitches and recovery points
 Mantec snorkels
 Transmission breathers
 Michelin XCL or BF Goodrich Mud Terrain tyres
 Upgraded suspension and transmission components
 Auxiliary fuel tanks
 Webasto fuel burning heaters
 Brownchurch / Safety Devices roof racks
 Hella driving, spot, fog, convoy and work lamps
 Brownchurch Bull bars and bush wires
 Flag poles
 Event plaques, decals and sponsor logos (including Camel Trophy Adventure Wear/Bags/Boots/Watches, Lee Cougan, Perception, Sony, Scott USA, Safety Devices, Land Rover, Fjällräven, Warn, Malaysia Airlines, Superwinch, Royal Dutch Shell, Shell, Avon)
 Expedition tools, Jerry cans, Pelican cases, Zarges boxes, high lift or New Concept air jacks, sand ladders, axes, ropes, drawbars, spades.
 Garmin, Terratrip and other navigation and communication equipment

Generally speaking, except for support and specialist vehicles, the Land Rovers were only used for one event. Some competitors purchased their vehicles and many remained in the host country. Consequently, those vehicles that returned to the United Kingdom were highly sought after as they were low mileage - but they were "Camel Trophy miles".
They were stripped of most of their equipment by Land Rover before they were released and restoring the vehicles to their original condition is expensive and time-consuming.

List of events and vehicles used

Event results 

Over the 18-year period in which the Camel Trophy featured Land Rover vehicles, Italian teams ultimately won the Camel Trophy three times - in 1982, 1984, and 1987. Teams from the Netherlands, France, Germany, and Turkey all won the Camel Trophy twice.

Camel Trophy's successor: the "G4 Challenge" 

In 2003, competitors representing sixteen nations helped Land Rover fill the gap left after the demise of Camel Trophy. Surprisingly, the inaugural Land Rover G4 Challenge contained many of the elements of Camel Trophy 1998, which Land Rover had reportedly been disappointed with. The "ultimate global adventure" was a test of skill, stamina, and mental agility in four separate stages, each in a different time zone. The prize was a top-of-the-range Freelander or Range Rover. The winner Rudi Thoelen declined a Range Rover, and opted for two Defenders instead.

The 2006 Land Rover G4 Challenge promised to be tougher than the inaugural event and delivered a more vehicle-based focus. The competitors, working in bi-national teams faced thousands of miles of vehicle-based activity in Thailand, Laos, Brazil, and Bolivia.

The 2008-9 G4 Challenge, supporting the Red Cross and based in Mongolia, was cancelled in December 2008 in the middle of the selection stages due to the current global economic downturn. Land Rover were forced to end the event as a cost saving-measure to allow them to focus on product launches in 2009.

See also 

 Camel (cigarette)
 Land Rover
 Land Rover Series
 Land Rover Defender
 Range Rover Classic
 Land Rover Discovery
 Land Rover Freelander

References

External links 

 Camel Trophy Club Camel Trophy Club intends to keep the Camel Trophy spirit alive!
 Camel Trophy Club photographic archive Hundreds of thousands of images available from Camel Trophy Club
 Camel Trophy Club video channel YouTube is a good source of free-to-view Camel Trophy footage and the Camel Trophy Club channel includes exclusive interviews with Camel Trophy people.
 Camel Trophy Shop Camel Trophy memorabilia
 Camel Trophy Forever - Brazil Photos, events, history, hobbies, articles ...
 Camel Trophy Portugal Photos, articles, vehicle replicas and events 
 SmokeandRubber.com Motorsort DVD Shop Re-release of the Camel Trophy events from 1990 to 1998 on DVD
 The Land Rover FAQ Camel Trophy Info - list of event results and vehicles used
 Camel Trophy Boats Sale of the original camel trophy boats used in the 2000 event. Good photos and info.
 Camel Trophy Netherlands A group of Camel trophy enthusiasts from the Netherlands.
 Camel Trophy Adventures - Bulgaria Camel Trophy Adventure Holidays in Bulgaria.
 Onze Defender Blog Private blog in Dutch

Land Rover
Off-road racing